The Telecom Commercial Communication Customer Preference Regulations, 2010 (TCCCPR) is a Regulation by Telecom Regulatory Authority of India, enacted in 2010, came into force from 27 September 2011. The regulation was launched by Telecom minister of India Kapil Sibal which enables people across India to respite from pesky marketing calls and SMS.

Background 

The Indian telecom Industry with nearly 900 million subscribers is the second largest wireless market in the world. Low tariffs and direct reach to consumers has made SMS and direct calling one of the most cost effective ways of selling services and products. However, telemarketing has become a major irritant to customers over few years.

Regulation 

Subscribers can opt for ‘fully blocked' category where all commercial calls/SMS will be blocked, he/she may also opt for ‘partially blocked' category to receive various promotional SMS.
No commercial communication, even for unregistered customers, shall be sent between 9.00 p.m. and 9.00 a.m., Only for Monday to Saturday.No telemarketing calls allowed on National holidays.so that customers are not disturbed.

200 SMS a day  
To make it difficult to broadcast millions of SMSs in a day, restriction on more than 100 SMS per SIM per day were introduced. TRAI directed all access providers to exclude the following persons from the limit of one hundred SMS per day per SIM. The exceptions include:
No limitation of number of SMS's of festival days per SIM
Dealers of telecom operators
e-Ticketing agencies
Social networking sites

However, 100 SMS a day plan proved to be disastrous for text addicts wring hands. According to a survey conducted by the Associated Chambers of Commerce and Industry of India, around 60% of the country's urban youth send/receive around 100-125 text messages daily to interact with their peer group. College students were hard hit by the new norms as they are the biggest users of the SMS as they are available at low cost tariffs. Owing to certain representations by service providers and consumers to increase the limit of 100 SMSes, TRAI had later decided to increase the limit of 100 SMSes per day per sim to 200 SMSes per day per Sim.

In July 2012, the Delhi High Court removed the ban on the SMS limit of 200 per day per sim, as it felt that the restriction infringed the constitutional right to freedom of speech and expression.

Freedom from disturbing calls 
All telemarketing calls will start with 140, to identify the call’s origin
Telemarketing calls and SMSes will be barred from 9 pm to 9 am for everyone
Customers can block such calls fully or partially by calling up 1909
Telecom firms will act against violation within 7 days of the compliant and inform the complainant

Penalties for telemarketers 
 for the first offence by telemarketer
 for the second violation
 for the third violation
 lakh for the fourth violation
 lakh for the fifth violation
 for the sixth violation, after which the telemarketer’s number will be blocked

Penalties for telecom firms 
Rs 10 lakh fine on service providers that violate mobile users ‘Do Not Call’ instructions for four times

See also 
 Telecommunications in India

References 

Telecommunications policy
Telecommunications in India